Private George Allan Mitchell VC (30 August 1911 – 24 January 1944) was an English recipient of the Victoria Cross, the highest and most prestigious award for gallantry in the face of the enemy that can be awarded to British and Commonwealth forces.

Details
George Allan Michell was born on 30 August 1911 in Highgate, north London. He attended Farmer Lane Boys' School in Leyton, at that time in Essex, but now in the London Borough of Waltham Forest in east London.

Mitchell was 32 years old, and a private in the British Army during the Second World War whilst serving with the 1st Battalion, London Scottish (Gordon Highlanders), during the Battle of Monte Damiano (part of the First Battle of Monte Cassino) in the Italian campaign when he earned the VC.

His citation in the London Gazette reads:

The medal
The Victoria Cross was presented to Mitchell's family By King George VI in an investiture ceremony at Buckingham Palace on 17 July 1945. In 1949, his brother placed Mitchell's medal group in the care of Farmer Road School, which was renamed George Mitchell School in his honour in 1959. In 2006, in an agreement organised by Mitchell's nephew, the medals were moved to the London Scottish Regimental Museum in Horseferry Road, London, The museum purchased the medals from the school for £150,000, which went towards the cost of a mobile classroom.

References

 British VCs of World War 2 (John Laffin, 1997)
 Monuments to Courage (David Harvey, 1999)
 The Register of the Victoria Cross (This England, 1997)

External links
CWGC entry

1911 births
1944 deaths
British Army personnel killed in World War II
London Scottish soldiers
People from Highgate
British World War II recipients of the Victoria Cross
British Army recipients of the Victoria Cross
Military personnel from London